York Maze is a maze constructed from maize located off the B1228 road near Elvington in England.

History 
The maze is owned by former farmer Tom Pearce who had the idea to construct a maze after seeing an advert for a "maize maze". Pearce had been looking to diversity after his entire beef herd had to be killed due to bovine spongiform encephalopathy. Formerly located in Heslington, Pearce was required to vacate the land to make way for the third campus of the University of York. It was at this point that Pearce purchased the area of land where the maze is now sited. The maze opened at its current location in 2008.

The maze was originally designed on paper and mapped out using sticks and string. In 2006, Pearce began using GPS to create the maze which made the process easier and allowed for more complex shapes.

Theme

References 

Mazes in the United Kingdom
2002 establishments in England
Tourist attractions in North Yorkshire